José Martí (1853–1895) was a Cuban poet, writer and leader of the Cuban independence movement.

José Martí may also refer to:

 Juan José Martí (1570?-1604), Spanish novelist
 José Martí y Monsó (1840-1912), Spanish painter
 José Luis Martí (born 1975), Spanish footballer, playing for Sevilla FC
 Bust of José Martí, a sculpture in Houston, Texas, United States
 José Martí International Airport, a Cuban airport

Marti, Jose